Mioljub "Bole" Denić (1925 – 13 November 2014) was a Serbian chief physician, cardiologist, basketball player and coach.

References

1925 births
2014 deaths
Basketball players from Belgrade
KK Borac Čačak coaches
KK Borac Čačak players
OKK Beograd coaches
OKK Beograd players
Player-coaches
Serbian cardiologists
Serbian men's basketball coaches
Serbian men's basketball players
University of Belgrade Faculty of Medicine alumni
Yugoslav basketball coaches
Yugoslav men's basketball players
1942 Belgrade Basketball Championship players